Starkville is a Statutory Town in Las Animas County, Colorado, United States. The population was 62 at the 2020 census.

History
The town was named for Albert G. Stark, a coal mine owner.

The community was formerly a company-owned coal-mining town owned and operated by the Colorado Fuel and Iron Company. On 8 October 1910, an explosion at the Starkville mine killed 56 miners. Exactly a month later, an explosion at the nearby Victor-American Fuel Company mine in Delagua killed 76. Miners from Starkville aided in the recovery efforts.

Geography
Starkville is adjacent to Interstate 25 and the Atchison, Topeka and Santa Fe Railroad.

Demographics

2010 United States census 
At the 2010 census, there were 59 people, 26 households, and 30 families living in the town. There were 35 housing units. The racial makeup of the town was 55.9% White, 1.7% Native American, 37.3% from other races, and 3.4% from two or more races. Hispanic or Latino of any race were 72.9% of the population.

Of the 26 households 23.1% had children under the age of 18 living with them, 46.2% were married couples living together, 11.5% had a female householder with no husband present, and 34.6% were non-families. 30.8% of households were one person and 11.5% were one person aged 65 or older. The average household size was 2.27 and the average family size was 2.76.

The age distribution was 22.1% under the age of 19, 6.8% from 20 to 24, 22.1% from 25 to 44, 35.7% from 45 to 64, and 13.6% 65 or older. The median age was 44.5 years.

The median household income was $46,250 and the median family income  was $51,250.

Census 2000 
At the 2000 census there were 128 people, 42 households, and 30 families living in the town. The racial makeup of the town was 71.88% White, 3.91% Native American, 14.84% from other races, and 9.38% from two or more races. Hispanic or Latino of any race were 64.06%.

Of the 42 households 31.0% had children under the age of 18 living with them, 61.9% were married couples living together, 9.5% had a female householder with no husband present, and 26.2% were non-families. 21.4% of households were one person and 11.9% were one person aged 65 or older. The average household size was 3.05 and the average family size was 3.55.

The age distribution was 27.3% under the age of 18, 10.2% from 18 to 24, 26.6% from 25 to 44, 25.8% from 45 to 64, and 10.2% 65 or older. The median age was 35 years. For every 100 females, there were 96.9 males. For every 100 females age 18 and over, there were 106.7 males.

The median household income was $42,708 and the median family income  was $50,000. Males had a median income of $30,417 versus $19,844 for females. The per capita income for the town was $14,297. There were 5.3% of families and 10.1% of the population living below the poverty line, including 18.2% of under eighteens and 22.2% of those over 64.

See also

Outline of Colorado
Index of Colorado-related articles
State of Colorado
Colorado cities and towns
Colorado municipalities
Colorado counties
Las Animas County, Colorado
Raton Pass
Santa Fe National Historic Trail
Starkville, Mississippi

References

External links
CDOT map of the Town of Starkville

Towns in Las Animas County, Colorado
Towns in Colorado